Vanessa Cootes (born 26 July 1969) is a former female rugby union winger.

Cootes was part of the 1998 Rugby World Cup champion squad, she scored four of the Black Ferns eight tries in the final. She also competed at the 2002 Rugby World Cup in Spain.

Cootes currently holds the Black Ferns record for the most tries scored, with 43 tries in 16 tests, and for the most points and tries scored in a match. She scored a record nine tries against France in 1996.

Cootes received her Black Ferns cap in 2018.

References

1969 births
Living people
New Zealand women's international rugby union players
New Zealand female rugby union players
Female rugby union players